Bikers Kental 2 is a 2019 Malaysian Malay-language action comedy road film. A sequel to the 2013 film Bikers Kental, the film continues the gang's motorcycle road trip adventure in southern Thailand six years later, as they fight the enemies and win back love.

It is released on 14 March 2019 in Malaysia and Brunei, on 21 March 2019 in Singapore.

Synopsis 
Six years later after the events in first film, Bidin Al Zaifa now owns a small successful motorcycle shop. Along with his friends Eddy and Aidil, they again embark on a journey to southern Thailand as Bidin wants to proposed to Cherry Porntit, a woman in Hatyai that he is madly in love with. Meanwhile, Cherry's brother who is a Muay Thai champion, and the gang's old-time enemy Al Buqerk stand the way.

Cast 
 Zizan Razak as Bidin Al-Zaifa
 Awie as Eddie Cuardo
 Afdlin Shauki as Aidid
 Amerul Affendi as Al Buqerk
 Hushairy Hussein as Eddy
 Julangtip Sukkasem as Cherry Pontit
 Kaew Korravee as Saiya Sukhapon
 Pont Cranium as Ananda
 Bront Palarae as Ponthaliwat Supachai

Production 
Filming took place in Phuket and Hatyai of Thailand.

References

External links 
 Bikers Kental 2 on Cinema.com.my
 Bikers Kental 2 on Popcorn Malaysia

2019 films
2019 comedy films
Malaysian comedy films